Larysa Vitaliivna Matvyeyeva (born May 9, 1969, Mykolaiv, Ukraine) — poet, novelist, playwright, translator.
She is a member of The National Writers' Union of Ukraine (1998).

Biography 
Larysa Matvyeyeva was born on May 9, 1969, in Mykolaiv, Ukraine.

Matvyeyeva graduated from The Mykolaiv National Pedagogical University (now—The Mykolaiv Vasyl Sukhomlynskyi National University) in 1992 (Faculty of History and Law). She has worked at the Mykolaiv State Enterprise "Shipyard named after 61 Communards" -- "UkrOboronProm"  since 1993  in the Computer and Information Department of Administrative Systems, and since 2007—she has been a chief second to the head-chief of the department.

Matvyeyeva has written poetry since her youth. She attended The Literary Studio "Borviy" led by the Ukrainian poet Dmytro Kremin at the Mykolaiv Regional House of Creative Arts. Her first poetry publication appeared in the Mykolaiv Regional Youth Newspaper Lenin's Followers in 1990.  She writes in the Russian language and employs a range of poetic forms. Her first book of poetry, Motif of Destiny, was published in 1994. She won the Mykolaiv poetry award for young writers, The Golden Harp, in 1995.

Matvyeyeva has published in a number genres: poetry, prose, essay, translation, poetic drama, and song lyrics. A number of Ukrainian composers and singers have created over 30 songs using her poetry for lyrics.

She is one of the editors for the international online magazine, Literary Mykolaiv.

A great amount of Matvyeyeva's work has seen publication in the local Mykolaiv and Ukrainian national press. She has received many awards for her contributions to the cultural development of Mykolaiv Region and Ukrainian culture and literature.

Works

Collections of poetry
 1994 Motif of Destiny («Мотив судьбы») 
 1996 Broken Pieces («Осколки»)
 2000 Full Moon («Полнолуние») 
 2016 Soul («Душа») 
 2018 Mosaic of Poems («Мозаика стихов») 
 2020 Let Saint Nicholas To Guard It («Пусть Николай Святой его хранит»)

Plays
 1996 His Majesty («Светлейший»)

Novels
 2002 Prohibited Luxury («Непозволительная роскошь»)

Translations 
Larysa Matvyeyeva has translated into the Russian language literary works by the following authors:
 Valerii Boychenko
 Volodymyr Sosiura
 Svitlana Ishchenko
 Omar Khayyam

Awards 
 Winner of The Golden Harp Poetry Contest (1995)
 Diploma in Strengthening of Nations' Friendships and The National Societies Council Anthem—The Festival of Folk Creativity Friendship (1997)
 Diploma in Creative Work With Children and Youth and Song Lyrics—The Festival of Modern Pop Song Horizon (2001)
 Diploma in Development of the National Literature from The Culture Department of Mykolaiv Regional Administration (2004)
 Certificate in the Ukrainian Culture Development from the mayor of the city of Kyiv (2004)
 Diploma of The Mykolaiv Regional Council of People's Deputies for contribution to the cultural development of the Mykolaiv Region (2014)

References

Sources

External links 
 Modern Encyclopedia of Ukraine
  The Mykolaiv Scientic-Pedagogic Library
 Poetry readings by Larisa Matveyeva at the Vereschahin Museum of Art, Mykolaiv, Ukraine, December 24, 2017
 Larisa Matveyeva: poem "Simply to Live" read by the author
 Larisa Matveyeva: poem "It Is Only My Dream" read by the author
 Larisa Matveyeva: poem "I Will Pray to the Church Domes" read by the author
 Poetry by Larisa Matveyeva on internet-magazine "The Literary Mykolaiv", selected 1
 Poetry by Larisa Matveyeva on internet-magazine "The Literary Mykolaiv", selected 2
 Children's fairy-tale A Wolf's House by Larisa Matveyeva
 Photo Gallery on internet-magazine "The Literary Mykolaiv"
 Larisa Matveyeva: Poems about Mykolaiv
 Larisa Matveyeva: Love Poetry
 Poetry Translations by Larisa Matveyeva
 Songs using Larisa Matveyeva's poetry for lyrics on internet-magazine "The Literary Mykolaiv"
 Novel by Larisa Matveyeva "Prohibited Luxury", part 1
 Novel by Larisa Matveyeva "Prohibited Luxury", part 2
 An article "A Poet, Novelist, Dramatist, Translator" about L.Matveyeva in the newspaper "The Evening Mykolaiv", June 30, 2020

1969 births
Living people
Ukrainian writers in Russian
Writers from Mykolaiv
Ukrainian women poets
20th-century Ukrainian poets
20th-century Ukrainian women writers
21st-century Ukrainian poets
21st-century Ukrainian women writers